Palaeomystella henriettiphila is a moth of the family Agonoxenidae. It is found in Brazil.

The length of the forewings is 7.3-9.2 mm. They are dark brownish gray with a green iridescence. The hindwings are slightly paler than the forewings.

The larvae feed on Henriettea succosa. They create a cataplasmatic histioid gall on their host plant. The larvae are pale gray and 4.6-5.6 mm long.

Etymology
The species epithet henriettiphila is derived from the generic name of its host species.

References

Moths described in 2008
Agonoxeninae
Moths of South America